"Always in My Heart" is a song by American R&B singer Tevin Campbell. It was written and produced by Babyface and Daryl Simmons for Campbell's second album I'm Ready (1993). Released by Qwest Records as the album's third single, it became his third straight single from to hit the top 20 on the US Billboard Hot 100 and the top 10 of the US Hot R&B/Hip-Hop Songs chart.

Track listings

All tracks written by Babyface and Daryl Simmons.

Notes
 denotes additional producer

Credits and personnel
Credits adapted from liner notes.

Tevin Campbell – lead and background vocals
Babyface – writer, composer, producer, all music and background vocals
Daryl Simmons – writer, composer and producer
Randy Walker – MIDI technician

Brad Gilderman – recording engineer
Milton Chan, Lori Fumar, Rail Rogut – assistant engineers
Barney Perkins – mixing engineer
Ivy Skoff – production coordinator

Charts

Weekly charts

Year-end charts

References

Tevin Campbell songs
1994 singles
Songs written by Babyface (musician)
Songs written by Daryl Simmons
Song recordings produced by Babyface (musician)
1994 songs
Contemporary R&B ballads